The Suzuki T200, also known as the Suzuki Invader and the X5 in the US is a , two-stroke, twin-cylinder motorcycle produced by the Japanese Suzuki company between 1967 and 1971. The model was a scaled down version of the Suzuki T20.

Technical details

Engine and transmission
The T200's engine was a scaled down version of the T20's unit. The 180° piston ported two stroke twin was of unit construction and had alloy head and alloy barrels with cast iron liners. The engine had a compression of 7:1.

Fuel was delivered by twin 22 mm Mikuni carburettors. The engine was lubricated by an improved version of the Suzuki Posi Force system which injected oil to the main bearings, conrod journals and cylinder bores.

Primary drive was by helical gears to a multi-plate wet clutch and five speed gearbox. Chain drive took power to the rear wheel.

Cycle parts
The duplex cradle frame was based on that of the T20 but was stiffer, leading to better handling. Rear suspension was by swinging arm with twin shock absorbers. At the front telescopic forks were used. Brakes were drums front and rear, the front being an effective 2ls item.

TC200
Suzuki also produced a 'Street Scramber' version of the bike, the TC200 Stingray. The machine had high level exhausts, one each side of the bike.

References

External links
 
 

T200
Motorcycles introduced in 1967
Two-stroke motorcycles
Motorcycles powered by straight-twin engines